Rydalmere ferry wharf is located on the northern side of the Parramatta River serving the Sydney suburb of Rydalmere.

History
Rydalmere wharf was opened in December 1993, when ferry services resumed operating between Meadowbank and Parramatta after an 85-year break.

Today, Rydalmere wharf is served by Sydney Ferries Parramatta River services operating between Circular Quay and Parramatta. The single wharf is served by RiverCat class ferries. During periods of low tide, services terminate at Rydalmere with passengers completing the final part of the journey by Busways bus.

In October 2018, the wharf was temporarily closed to facilitate an upgrade to services. The upgrades will improve the safety and accessibility of the wharf and make it quicker and more efficient to board and disembark ferries. The upgrade will also improve weather protection, seating and waiting areas, lighting and signage.  The wharf reopened on 20 March 2019.

Wharves & services

References

External links

 Rydalmere Wharf at Transport for New South Wales (Archived 13 June 2019)
Rydalmere Local Area Map Transport for NSW

Ferry wharves in Sydney